Anne Davies  is professor of law and public policy in the Faculty of Law of the University of Oxford and professorial fellow in law at Brasenose College, Oxford, She was dean of the Faculty of Law from 2015 to 2020. She is a senior research fellow at the Blavatnik School of Government, where she chairs the Procurement of Government Outcomes Club.  She is a former general editor of the Oxford Journal of Legal Studies.  she is editor-in-chief of the International Journal of Comparative Labour Law and Industrial Relations.

Davies was a student at Lincoln College, Oxford, and won the Gibbs and Martin Wronker University Prizes for Law.  She was a Prize Fellow at All Souls College, Oxford, from 1995 to 2001, during which time she completed her doctorate on contractualisation in the National Health Service.  After moving to Brasenose in 2001, she became reader in public law in 2006, and professor of law and public policy in 2010.  She is a member of the editorial board of the Industrial Law Journal, the European Labour Law Journal and Current Legal Problems.

She is an independent member of the council of the Advisory, Conciliation and Arbitration Service, and a member of the advisory panel to the Welsh Language Commissioner.  she is Honorary Secretary of The Society of Legal Scholars.

Books 
Accountability: A Public Law Analysis of Government By Contract (Oxford University Press 2001)
Perspectives on Labour Law (Cambridge University Press 2004, 2nd edition 2009)
The Public Law of Government Contracts (Oxford University Press 2008)
EU Labour Law (Elgar European Law Series 2012)
Employment Law (Longman Law Series 2015)

References

External links
Profile of Anne Davies in Oxford Law 2016

Living people
Fellows of Brasenose College, Oxford
Alumni of Lincoln College, Oxford
Legal scholars of the University of Oxford
Fellows of All Souls College, Oxford
Year of birth missing (living people)